The 2014 NASCAR Whelen Euro Series was the sixth Racecar Euro Series season, and the second under the NASCAR Whelen Euro Series branding. The season consisted of six meetings – with two races at each meeting – starting on 12 April at Circuit Ricardo Tormo in Valencia, and ending on 12 October at the Bugatti Circuit in Le Mans.

The Elite division title went down to the final race of the season, and was ultimately decided in favour of PK Carsport driver Anthony Kumpen, by just a single point. Kumpen only won one race during the season, coming at the final race weekend, but with top-ten finishes in each of the season's races, it allowed him to just fend off the defending champion Ander Vilariño of TFT Racing. Vilariño won the most races during the season with four and took the most podium finishes with nine, but lost the title due to the series' double points system that was in effect for the final two events of the season. Third place in the championship went to CAAL Racing's Eddie Cheever III, who took three wins during the season. A total of seven drivers won races in the division during the season, which set a new series record. Aside from the top trio in the championship, Yann Zimmer won at Valencia, Borja García and Frédéric Gabillon both won at the Nürburgring, while Mathias Lauda won a race at Tours Speedway, the series' first race to be held in wet conditions at an oval.

In the Elite 2 class, the championship battle was won by another PK Carsport driver as Maxime Dumarey sealed the title with a fifth-place finish in the final race of the season. Dumarey finished outside the top ten on only one occasion, and achieved a single victory during the season, coming at Magione. Finishing in the runner-up position, seven points adrift of Dumarey, was Renauer Motorsport's Philipp Lietz, who like Dumarey, only finished outside the top ten on one occasion. Lietz won the other race to be held at Magione, and moved ahead of Thomas Ferrando (OverDrive) in the standings, after Ferrando was forced to retire from the final Le Mans race. Ferrando was a double winner during the season, winning both races at the Nürburgring. Eight drivers won races during the season, with no driver winning more than two races. Neal Van Vaerenbergh (Valencia), Wilfred Boucenna (Brands Hatch) and Denis Dupont (Tours) were other double winners, with the remaining race wins taken by Guillaume Rousseau and Gabriele Gardel, at Le Mans.

With championship titles in both classes, PK Carsport were comfortable winners of the teams' championship, which counted points as a whole from both classes. PK Carsport finished 135 points clear of their nearest contenders, TFT – Banco Santander.

Teams and drivers

Elite 1 Division

Elite 2 Division

Schedule and results
The schedule was announced in December 2013.

Elite 1

Elite 2

See also

2014 NASCAR Sprint Cup Series
2014 NASCAR Nationwide Series
2014 NASCAR Camping World Truck Series
2014 NASCAR K&N Pro Series East
2014 NASCAR K&N Pro Series West
2014 NASCAR Whelen Modified Tour
2014 NASCAR Whelen Southern Modified Tour
2014 NASCAR Canadian Tire Series
2014 NASCAR Toyota Series

References

External links
 

NASCAR Whelen Euro Series seasons
NASCAR Whelen Euro Series